Barroz: Guardian of Treasures – 3D is an upcoming Indian Malayalam-language fantasy film directed by Mohanlal in his directorial debut. The screenplay was written by Jijo Punnoose based on his novel Barroz: Guardian of D'Gama's Treasure. The film was produced by Antony Perumbavoor through Aashirvad Cinemas. It stars Mohanlal in the title role, with Maya, Sara Vega, Tuhin Menon, Guru Somasundaram, and Cesar Lorente Raton in other important roles.

Principal photography began in March 2021, and after stalling for a while due to the COVID-19 pandemic, it restarted in December with a revised story, screenplay, and cast, scrapping the former version, and completed production in July 2022. The film was primarily shot at Kochi and Goa, and two songs in Bangkok and Chennai. The film was shot in 3D and is planning for a 2023 release.

Premise 
Barroz, a treasure guardian has been protecting Vasco da Gama's hidden treasure for 400 years and has been entrusted to hand over the wealth only to a true descendant of Gama.

Cast
 Mohanlal as Barroz
 Maya as Isabella
 Sara Vega as Teresa de Gama
 Tuhin Menon as Ron Madhav
 Guru Somasundaram
 Ignacio Mateos as Cristóvão da Gama
 Kallirroi Tziafeta
 Cesar Lorente Raton
 Komal Sharma
 Padmavati Rao
 Pedro Figueiredo
 Jayachandran Palazhy
 Geethi Sangeetha

Production

Development 
On 21 April 2019, Mohanlal published a blog post in social media announcing his directorial debut, a 3D film based on the novel Barroz: Guardian of D'Gama's Treasure by Jijo Punnoose. He said he and T. K. Rajeev Kumar were originally planning to make a 3D stage play for which they consulted Punnoose, who directed India's first 3D film My Dear Kuttichathan (1984), however, it was put on hold due to high production cost. At that meeting, Mohanlal happened to hear about Punnoose's novel and expressed interest in making it into a film and directing it, which Punnoose agreed. Mohanlal said the film would be shot in Goa and the cast includes many foreign actors. He called it "a fantasy film for children". Its story is centred around a 17th century fable based on a Portuguese-Afro-Indian myth along the Malabar Coast about a hidden treasure of a D'Gama family. He said the story is "set against the backdrop of the maritime history of Portugal, Spain, Africa and India. Barroz is indeed, about our shared heritage that we inherited from our ancestors". The mythical being is locally known as kappiri muthappan. Mohanlal said it took one-and-a-half years to finalise the screenplay. He revealed he had initially encouraged Punnoose himself to direct the film, who showed no interest, and also approached some others before taking up direction. Punnoose gave Mohanlal liberty to make changes in the story. His original premise had a much serious tone, which was subject to revision, said Mohanlal.

Punnoose later revealed a much elaborate account about the film's development and how it deviates from his original work. According to Punnoose, his original screenplay was based on a Portuguese-Afro-Indian myth. It was one among many native fables he found in 1980 for making India's first 3D film before eventually choosing Kuttichathan myth. He revisited the subject in 2003 and wrote a story and circulated it among his friends. Years later, heeding to his colleagues' insistence, he decided to make it into a film in English and Hispanic languages and proceeded with pre-production. He revised the 2003 story and wrote it down as a novel in 2017 for claiming copyright. It had two main characters—Barroz, an aged Afrikaner ghost and Isabella, a teenage girl of Malayali-Portuguese lineage. His screenplay had some deviation from the novel with regard to its setting and narrative technique. In mid-2018, Mohanlal and Kumar reached out to Punnoose for consultation for a 3D stage show. Kumar, who was aware of Punnoose's plans, suggested making the film in Malayalam language with Mohanlal in the role of Barroz. In February 2019, Punnoose came up with an idea to change the character to a Malayali to fit Mohanlal, but stepped out from directing, that is when Mohanlal came onboard as director, with Antony Perumbavoor as producer. Punnoose rewrote the screenplay 22 times to his satisfaction and to the liking of Mohanlal and Antony, while keeping Isabella as the central character. Mohanlal came up with many story elements, which was incorporated.

Preparations were completed by early January 2020. Mohanlal told that filming would begin in June. However, when they were about to begin set work in February, the COVID-19 pandemic in India delayed the plans. The work resumed by the end of 2020. Art and costume design, props, and sets were made by a workforce of 160 personnel working daily at Navodaya Studio. The extra time was used to patch up the previsualization, animation of voodoo doll, visual effects, and action sequences. Pre-production was completed in March 2021. An event was conducted on 24 March 2021 announcing the commencement of production, along with a customary pooja function at Navodaya Studio. Filming began that month, but stopped after entering a week into production due to second wave of COVID-19 pandemic. By the time the lockdown started easing, Aashirvad Cinemas had moved on to producing films designed for direct OTT streaming. There were talks about shelving Barroz, for it seemed nonviable. After the sales of OTT films, Mohanlal revived the project in November 2021. Since it was difficult to bring back foreign actors and shoot on farther locations under the new circumstances, after elaborate discussions, it was decided to change the story, screenplay, and actors. In December 2012, Mohanlal along with Kumar rewrote the scenes, locations, and characters for a viable completion of the film. Mohanlal remodeled his character in the lines of his successful commercial films to cater his fans. In May 2022, Jijo said that he is going ahead with his original plan to direct a film in English and Hispanic languages since his original screenplay and production design has not been utilised, and left Barroz.

Casting
Through a video posted on social media in July 2019, Mohanlal revealed that Spanish actors Paz Vega, Rafael Amargo, and Caesar Lorente Raton would appear in the film. Amargo was cast in the role of Vasco da Gama and Vega as his wife. In September 2019, Mohanlal announced that American child actress Shayla McCaffrey would play the film's lead role. In March 2020, Pratap Pothen confirmed to have signed the film for the role of a voodoo doll. Prithviraj Sukumaran was spotted during the film's pre-production discussions in March. He was confirmed to be part of the cast later that month. Vega was replaced by her sister Sara Vega, who plays Teresa de Gama. Since the film was delayed due to COVID-19 lockdown, some major cast members were replaced when the production resumed in December 2021. Prithviraj opted out from the film due to scheduling conflicts with Kaduva and Aadujeevitham. He was replaced by Tuhin Menon. McCaffrey had scheduling conflicts with her academic studies and had grown since then with apparent physical changes. She was replaced by Indo-British actress Maya. In December 2021, Guru Somasundaram confirmed to be part of the cast, who received a call from Mohanlal after the release of his Minnal Murali (2021). He said he would join the sets in February 2022. Komal Sharma was cast in an undisclosed role. On her experience with the film, she said Mohanlal treated everyone equally on the sets, irrespective of their status as leading stars, newcomers, or kids.

Filming
Principal photography began on 31 March 2021 at sets built in Fort Kochi. K. U. Mohanan, who was originally attached as the cinematographer was replaced by Santosh Sivan before filming began. According to Sivan, "it's a visual film that doesn't have a conventional story. It's got magical realism, 3D and is VFX heavy". Santhosh Raman oversaw the production design. Shooting underwent at sets in Navodaya Studio in April. Goa is featured prominently in the film and schedule there was to begin in early August.

Filming that had begun with 85 crew went on for a week in Kochi before the second COVID-19 lockdown ceased it. With several cast and crew testing positive for coronavirus, the month of May was dedicated to tending the 24 infected members to recuperate, and finding ways to transport foreign actors back to their home countries since airlines had shutdown operations. With Aashirvad Cinemas moving on to producing films designed for direct OTT streaming, Barroz almost reached to the point of cancellation. Antony instructed to dismantle the treasure cellar set at Navodaya Studio. Barroz was revived in November 2021 by the initiative of Mohanlal. He had a four months gap before he would move on to other films, which Antony decided to utilize for Barroz. However, under the new circumstances, they found it impossible to bring back foreign actors who returned home and to shoot on location even at places near as Goa, let alone farther. After elaborate discussions, it was decided to change the story, screenplay, and actors in December 2021 for a feasible production in and around Kochi, with major filming taking place at indoor sets in Navodaya Studio.

Filming resumed on 26 December, recasting and reshoots were done. Mohanlal scrapped the portions of Prithviraj Sukumaran shot in April 2021. From February to April 2022, filming took place in Kochi. In April, Punnoose came to help execute a rotating-set mechanism in which Barroz walks on the walls of the treasure cellar, it was his only involvement after the screenplay change. It was followed by a schedule in Goa, which was completed in May. With that, majority of the film was completed, with two songs remaining. A song involving animation sequence was filmed in Bangkok in early July. The title song was filmed in Chennai by the end of that month, which was originally supposed to be shot in Portugal. Filming was wrapped on 29 July 2022. T. K. Rajeev Kumar worked as an associate director in the film. Mohanlal's daughter Vismaya Mohanlal worked as an assistant director under him.

Post-production
The post-production work of the film began in 2022 soon after the filming was completed. It underwent at Thailand and India, and sound mixing in Los Angeles. In September 2022, Mohanlal said they are planning to complete the post-production and submit the film before the Central Board of Film Certification in 2022 itself, and if everything goes as planned, the film can be brought to theatres within March 2023.

Music
During the film's pre-production in 2019, Mohanlal hired 13-year-old pianist Lydian Nadhaswaram for composing the film's music, a child prodigy who won the CBS reality talent show The World's Best that year.

Release
In September 2022, Mohanlal said that Barroz is planned as to be released in theatres within March 2023. In November 2022, in a radio interview in Doha, Mohanlal said that the film's trailer is scheduled to be released in theatres along with Avatar: The Way of Water on 16 December 2022.

References

External links
 

Upcoming films
Upcoming Malayalam-language films
Indian children's fantasy films
Indian 3D films
Films about undead
Films about fairies and sprites
Films set in the 17th century
Treasure hunt films
Films based on Indian novels
Films about Voodoo
Films about witchcraft
Films shot in Goa
Films shot in Kochi
Aashirvad Cinemas films
2023 directorial debut films
Film productions suspended due to the COVID-19 pandemic